For Pete's Sake is a 1974 American screwball comedy film starring Barbra Streisand and directed by Peter Yates. The screenplay by Stanley Shapiro and Maurice Richlin chronicles the misadventures of a Brooklyn housewife. In 1977, it was used as the basis for the Hindi film Aap Ki Khatir.

Plot 
Henrietta and Pete Robbins are a young couple in Brooklyn struggling to get by on the income he earns as a cab driver. His pompous sister-in-law Helen delights in reminding them that an early marriage robbed him of a college education and how much better off she and her husband Fred are. When Pete gets an inside tip on pork belly futures, Henrietta borrows $3,000 from a Mafia loan shark to purchase the commodity. Unfortunately, its value doesn't increase as rapidly as she anticipated. When she's unable to pay her debt, her contract is sold to Mrs. Cherry, a grandmotherly-type who operates a prostitution ring. When Henrietta's initial attempts at entertaining clients prove to be less than successful, her contract is sold yet again...and again, as Henrietta fails to fulfill the requirements of each new individual to whom she becomes indebted — each time for more money — and tries to keep her new enterprises secret from her unsuspecting husband.

Principal cast 
 Barbra Streisand as Henrietta Robbins 
 Michael Sarrazin as Pete Robbins 
 Estelle Parsons as Helen Robbins
 William Redfield as Fred Robbins 
 Molly Picon as Mrs. Cherry 
 Louis Zorich as Nick Kasabian
 Heywood Hale Broun as Judge Hiller 
 Ed Bakey as Angelo
 Peter Mamakos as Dominic
 Joseph Maher as Mr. Coates
 Anne Ramsey as Telephone Lady
 Vincent Schiavelli as Check Out Man
 Sidney Miller as Drunk Driver
 Norman Marshall as First Worker
 Martin Erlichman as Man In Theatre
 Joe Pantoliano as Undercover Arresting Officer (Uncredited)

Production 
The title tune "For Pete's Sake (Don't Let Him Down)," was written by Artie Butler and Mark Lindsay, and sung by Barbra Streisand.

The movie was filmed on location in Brooklyn, New York, and Los Angeles. The suburban scene at Helen and Fred Robbins' house was filmed in Paramus, New Jersey.

Critical reception 
In his review in The New York Times, Vincent Canby called the film "an often boisterously funny old-time farce" and added "The movie may not hold together as any kind of larger comic statement, but the laughs are self-sustaining throughout...Miss Streisand's comedy range is narrow, like a cartoon character's, but For Pete's Sake operates almost entirely within that range. She's at her best in this kind of farce." TV Guide wrote "A feeble attempt to do a Hawksian 1930s comedy in the 1970s" and "Changing the title from "July Pork Bellies" did not help, and everyone concerned with this picture would be wise to omit it from their credits".

References

External links 
 
 
 
 
 Barbra Streisand Archives "For Pete's Sake" page 

1974 films
1970s screwball comedy films
American screwball comedy films
Columbia Pictures films
Films set in New York City
Films directed by Peter Yates
1974 comedy films
1970s English-language films
1970s American films